Juan Andrés Marvezzi (16 November 1915 - 4 April 1971) was an Argentine football striker, he played for Argentina was the top scorer in the Copa América 1941. He holds the record as Club Atlético Tigre's all-time top scorer, with 116 goals.

Club career
Marvezzi spent his early years with Argentino de Rosario and Bella Vista de Tucumán before joining Tigre in 1937, he played for the club until 1942 when he had a brief spell at Racing Club de Avellaneda before returning to Tigre in 1943.

International career
Marvezzi played for Argentina in the Copa América 1941, eventually finishing as the tournament top scorer, he scored five goals in a single game against Ecuador

Titles

References

1915 births
1971 deaths
Sportspeople from San Miguel de Tucumán
Argentine footballers
Association football forwards
Argentina international footballers
Club Atlético Tigre footballers
Racing Club de Avellaneda footballers
Copa América-winning players
Argentino de Rosario footballers